Hanly is a surname. Notable people with the name include:
Don Hanly (born 1954), Australian sprinter
Frank Hanly (1863–1920), American politician, Governor of Indiana
Gil Hanly (born 1934), New Zealand artist
Joe Hanly (died 1996), Irish rower
Kate Hanly (born 1993), Canadian long track speed skater
Mick Hanly (born 1949), Irish singer and composer
Pat Hanly (1932–2004), New Zealand painter
Peter Hanly (born 1964), Irish actor
Thomas Burton Hanly (1812–1880), American lawyer and politician who represented Arkansas in the Congress of the Confederate States
Vincent Hanly (1899–1970), Irish Roman Catholic priest, Bishop of Elphin

See also
Hanley (name)